The Indonesia Forward Cabinet is the current cabinet of Indonesia. It was announced by the President of Indonesia Joko Widodo on 23 October 2019. The president has so far reshuffled the cabinet on five occasions: first in December 2020, second in April 2021, third in March 2022, fourth in June 2022, and fifth in September 2022.

Members

Head of Cabinet

Coordinating Ministers

Ministers

Deputy Ministers

Other positions

Reshuffles

First Reshuffle
On 22 December 2020, the president replaced six ministers. The most notable addition to the cabinet was businessman Sandiaga Uno. His admission into the cabinet following his former running mate in the 2019 presidential election Prabowo Subianto, made it the first time in Indonesia's history that all former contestants of a single presidential election were in the same cabinet. The new ministers were sworn in on 23 December 2020. Five deputy ministers were also appointed, three of them to new deputy minister positions.

Second Reshuffle
On 30 March 2021, the president proposed to the People's Representative Council changes to the structure of his cabinet, seeking to merge the Ministry of Research and Technology and the Ministry of Education and Culture into a single ministry named the Ministry of Education, Culture, Research, and Technology. He also proposed a new ministry, the Ministry of Investment to be spun off from the Coordinating Ministry for Maritime and Investments Affairs, but remaining under the latter's coordination, while the National Research and Innovation Agency would be separated as a new non-ministerial agency. On 9 April 2021, the People's Representative Council approved the changes. On 13 April 2021, presidential spokesman Ali Mochtar Ngabalin said the second reshuffle would take place in the second week of April. However, the reshuffle was announced on 28 April 2021. Unusually, it not only reshuffled some ministers, but also disbanded a ministerial institution during the mid-term.

Third Reshuffle
Since the National Mandate Party joined the government coalition on 25 August 2021, there has been controversy over a potential third cabinet reshuffle to allow the party to join the cabinet. On 23 September 2021, the party stated to be ready to take place and contributing together with the government in the cabinet. It was said that the third reshuffle will take place between the end of September 2021 and early October 2021; however, the deadline passed and no reshuffle took place. On 25 October 2021, President Spokesperson Fadjroel Rachman was appointed as Indonesian Ambassador to Kazakhstan, leaving his post vacant. The position was then filled by Joko Widodo himself.

On 17 November 2021, the question of the third reshuffle arose again. However, sources from unnamed president officials revealed that the future reshuffle was not because of issues regarding minister performance, but due to replacement after several ministers contracted COVID-19 and became physically disabled, severely limiting their ability to serve in their positions. Since the end of 2020, Joko Widodo opened many deputy minister posts in many ministries, however, the positions are yet to be filled. This includes the Deputy Minister post at Ministry of Energy and Mineral Resources, adding to the long list of vacant deputy minister posts created in his presidency. On 18 November 2021, the People's Consultative Assembly formally requested Joko Widodo to conduct a reshuffle as fast as possible due to the large number of vacant deputy minister positions.

On 8 March 2022, a question of the third reshuffle arose again. This time there was a rumor that National Mandate Party will gain a position in the cabinet and the reshuffle will be done in late March 2022. The rumor was quickly dispelled by Zulkifli Hasan, the party leader himself. In fact, the third reshuffle realized on 10 March 2022. In the third reshuffle, Bambang Susantono was inaugurated as the Head of Nusantara Capital City Authority, and Dhony Rahajoe was inaugurated as the Deputy Head of Nusantara Capital City Authority.

Fourth Reshuffle
On 15 June 2022, the fourth reshuffle came into fruition. In this reshuffle, 2 ministers reshuffled, and 3 deputy ministers will be set up. A Deputy minister post, Deputy Minister of Public Works and Housing is vacated. The reshuffle marked as the first time an Indonesian cabinet is reshuffled four times since the era of the National Unity Cabinet under Wahid's administration.

Fifth Reshuffle
On 24 June 2022, Tjahjo Kumolo reported contracted unknown illness and replaced by Mahfud MD as ad interim Minister of Administrative and Bureaucratic Reform. He died after being hospitalized at Abdi Waluyo Hospital in Jakarta on 1 July 2022. Potential fifth reshuffle will be announced later after mourning period. Fifth reshuffle likely done after 15 July 2022, coincidentally at the day with the end of mourning period and Tito Karnavian limit of ad interim. On 15 July, Mahfud MD appointed as acting Minister of Administrative and Bureaucratic Reform. On 7 September 2022, Abdullah Azwar Anas become Minister of Administrative and Bureaucratic Reform in the fifth reshuffle.

Potential Sixth Reshuffle 
Nasdem Party declared Joko Widodo political rival, Anies Baswedan, a pro-Islamist right-wing populist politician, as presidential candidate on 3 October 2022. As the result, pro-Joko Widodo side voiced and promoted the reshuffle and expelled Nasdem Party from the cabinet. On 23 December 2022, Joko Widodo announced he will reshuffle his cabinet, although not giving much detail which minister that will be reshuffled. The Executive Office of the President of the Republic of Indonesia confirmed that the reshuffle will be realized in January 2023, but it never happened until the time past.

Zainuddin Amali expressed his intention to step down his position as Minister of Youth and Sport Affairs after being elected as Indonesian Football Association vice president. His intention finally realized and Joko Widodo accepted his resignation on 13 March 2023. On 16 March 2023, Zainuddin Amali stepped down from the minister position and replaced with Muhadjir Effendy as acting minister.

See also

 Politics of Indonesia

References

 
Cabinets of Indonesia
2019 establishments in Indonesia
Cabinets established in 2019
Current governments
Cabinet